Alessandra Khadijah Usman (born December 21, 1988) is an Indonesian film actress, Ambassador for Ministry of Tourism of Indonesia, model and beauty pageant titleholder who won the Puteri Indonesia Pariwisata of Puteri Indonesia 2010, and automatically acquired the title Puteri Indonesia Pariwisata 2010. She represented Indonesia in Miss Asia Pacific World 2011, where she ended-up won 1st Runner-up and Best Style Dress award in the pageant.

Early life and education
Alessandra was born in Jakarta – Indonesia, to a Dutch mother Lunggi Nodie and Gorontaloan father, Mohamad El Idris Usman. She has one older sister, Sarah Marhula Usman and two younger brother named Mohammad Salman Usman (died on June 4, 2011) and Mohammad Salahuddin Usman. She has been working as a model since the age of 15, and her hobby includes dancing and pilates. She has also been working as a Ambassador for Ministry of Tourism of Indonesia, since she was crowned as Puteri Indonesia Pariwisata 2019. She holds a bachelor degree in Business Management from Bandung Institute of Technology, Bandung, West Java, Indonesia.

On September 14, 2017, Alessandra was married with an Indonesian property businessman, Agga Diguci, the wedding reception was held in Jakarta – Indonesia with a Gorontaloan tradition and heritage theme. she is giving birth to her first daughter Salma Rosevella Diguci on June 12, 2018.

Pageantry

Puteri Indonesia 2010
Alessandra Usman, competed in Puteri Indonesia 2010 national pageant as the representative of her hometown province Gorontalo, Alessandra was crowned Puteri Indonesia Pariwisata 2010 at the finals held at the Jakarta Convention Center, Jakarta, on October 8, 2010, by the outgoing titleholder of Puteri Indonesia Pariwisata 2005, Isti Ayu Pratiwi of North Maluku. 

Alessandra was crowned together with her two bestfriends, Nadine Alexandra Dewi Ames as Puteri Indonesia 2010 and Reisa Kartikasari Broto Asmoro as Puteri Indonesia Lingkungan 2010.

Miss Asia Pacific World 2011
As Puteri Indonesia Pariwisata 2010, Sandra represented Indonesia in Miss Asia Pacific World 2011 on October 15, broadcast live from Busan Yachting Center, Busan, South Korea. Before the pageant begin, she was the most favourite to win the Miss Asia Pacific World 2011 crown in many pageant-polis. She placed as the 1st runner-up, and won the Best Style Dress award in the pageant.

Filmography
Alessandra has appeared on several television film and cinema film. On 2016, Alessandra started her foray into the world of acting career where she is starred on I am Hope, together with actress Tatjana Saphira and actor Tio Pakusadewo.

Movies

References

External links
 
 
 Official Puteri Indonesia Official Website
 Official Miss Universe Official Website

Living people
1988 births
Indo people
Puteri Indonesia contestants
Puteri Indonesia winners